The Palm i705 was an upgrade from the last series of Palm PDAs to use the now discontinued Palm.net service to access the World Wide Web from Palm devices.  It featured 8MB of onboard memory and SD/MMC slots.  It used the Motorola Dragonball VZ 33 MHz processor and ran Palm OS 4.1, it was noted as being the first Palm.net capable device without a flip out antenna and with an internal rechargeable battery, though only the third of the three models manufactured by Palm.

See also
Palm.net
Palm (PDA)
Palm OS
PalmSource, Inc.
Palm, Inc.
Graffiti (Palm OS)

External links
 Palm i705 Handheld Debuts: Only Secure, Integrated Wireless, Email Solution With Web Access, Palm Press Release, January 28, 2002

i705
68k-based mobile devices